Mathylde Frontus (born December 1, 1977) is an American politician. A Democrat, Frontus represented the 46th district in the New York State Assembly. Her district includes portions of southern Brooklyn, including Coney Island, Brighton Beach, Bay Ridge, and Dyker Heights.

As of 2023, Frontus remains the only person since Adele Cohen, who retired in 2006, to have represented the 46th State Assembly District and not have faced criminal charges.

Early life and education 
Born December 1, 1977 in Brooklyn, Frontus is the daughter of Haitian immigrants. Frontus is a graduate of New York University, Teachers College, Columbia University, and Harvard Divinity School.

Career 
Prior to holding elected office, Frontus was well known as a community organizer in southwestern Brooklyn, and notably  founded the Urban Neighborhood Services. She received the Characters Unite Award from NBCUniversal for her work in 2014.

New York State Assembly 
In 2018, Assembly member Pamela Harris resigned her seat after allegations of fraud led to an 11-count indictment.  Soon afterward, Frontus announced her candidacy for the open seat, and then won the Democratic primary election over Ethan Lustig-Elgrably by only 51 votes. In the general election, Frontus defeated Republican Steven Saperstein with 56% of the vote.

In March 2020, Frontus fired a member of her staff, Marilyn Franks, a receptionist in Frontus’ Coney Island district office, after Franks shared a message on Facebook that urged patrons to avoid Chinese restaurants and businesses during the COVID-19 pandemic. Frontus was reelected in the November 2020 election.

References

External links 
 Mathylde Frontus - New York State Assembly (official site)

Living people
Democratic Party members of the New York State Assembly
21st-century American politicians
Politicians from Brooklyn
Teachers College, Columbia University alumni
New York University alumni
Harvard Divinity School alumni
21st-century American women politicians
Women state legislators in New York (state)
1977 births
American politicians of Haitian descent